Suddi Sangaati was a Kannada language weekly newspaper published from Karnataka, India. It was founded by Indudhara Honnapura, in 1985. As of 1987, it had a circulation of 44,000.

See also
 List of Kannada-language newspapers
 List of Kannada-language magazines
 List of newspapers in India
 Media in Karnataka
 Media of India

References

Kannada-language newspapers
Newspapers published in Karnataka
Publications established in 1985
1985 establishments in Karnataka